Tyleria is a genus of flowering plants belonging to the family Ochnaceae. It is also within the Sauvagesieae subfamily.

It is native to Brazil, Guyana and Venezuela.

Known species
As accepted by Kew:

The genus name of Tyleria is in honour of Sidney Frederick Tyler (1907–1993), American banker and cattle rancher; supporter of charitable organizations. 
It was first described and published in Bull. Torrey Bot. Club Vol.58 on page 391 in 1931.

References

Ochnaceae
Malpighiales genera
Plants described in 1931
Flora of North Brazil
Flora of Guyana
Flora of Venezuela